Dioon tomasellii is a species of cycad in the family Zamiaceae. It is endemic to Mexico, where it occurs in the states of Durango, Guerrero, Jalisco, Michoacán, and Nayarit.

This plant grows in oak and pine-oak forest and woodland habitat. Threats to the species include destruction of the habitat for agriculture and overcollection for horticultural purposes.

This species was first described in 1984. It was revised in 1997, with one variety being elevated to species status as Dioon sonorense.

References

External links
 
 

tomasellii
Endemic flora of Mexico
Flora of Durango
Flora of Guerrero
Flora of Jalisco
Flora of Michoacán
Flora of Nayarit
Plants described in 1984